Qaiser Waheed (born 15 January 1966) is a Pakistani former first-class cricketer. He is now an umpire and has stood in matches in the 2015–16 Quaid-e-Azam Trophy.

References

External links
 

1966 births
Living people
Pakistani cricketers
Pakistani cricket umpires
Lahore cricketers
People from Gujranwala District
Punjabi people